The sleeping position is the body configuration assumed by a person during or prior to sleeping. It has been shown to have health implications, particularly for babies.

Sleeping preferences
A Canadian survey found that 39% of respondents preferring the "log" position (lying on one's side with the arms down the side) and 28% preferring to sleep on their side with their legs bent.

A Travelodge survey found that 50% of heterosexual British couples prefer sleeping back-to-back, either not touching (27%) or touching (23%). Spooning was next, with the man on the outside 20% of the time vs. 8% with the woman on the outside. 10% favoured the "lovers' knot" (facing each other with legs intertwined), though all but 2% separated before going to sleep. The "Hollywood pose" of the woman with her head and arm on the man's chest was chosen by 4%.

Health issues

Sleep position in babies
In the 1958 edition of his best-selling book The Common Sense Book of Baby and Child Care, paediatrician Dr Benjamin Spock warned against placing a baby on its back, writing, "if [an infant] vomits, he's more likely to choke on the vomitus." However, later studies have shown that placing a young baby in a prone position increases the risk of sudden infant death syndrome (SIDS). A 2005 study concluded that "systematic review of preventable risk factors for SIDS from 1970 would have led to earlier recognition of the risks of sleeping on the front and might have prevented over 10,000 infant deaths in the UK and at least 50,000 in Europe, the USA, and Australasia."

Sleep position and snoring
It is recommended that people at risk of obstructive sleep apnea sleep on their side and with a 30° or higher elevation of the upper body. Snoring, which may be (but is not necessarily) an indicator of obstructive sleep apnea, may also be alleviated by sleeping on one's side.

Sleep position and heart disease
Modern scientific studies have suggested a beneficial effect of the right lateral decubitus position on the heart. In particular, one study assessed the autonomic effect of three sleep positions (supine, left lateral decubitus, and right lateral decubitus) in healthy subjects using spectral heart rate variability analysis. The results indicated that cardiac vagal activity was greatest when subjects were in the right lateral decubitus position.

Sleep position and gastroesophageal reflux
The right lateral sleeping position results in much more reflux in the night than the left lateral position and prone position.

Sleep position and sleep paralysis 
Sleeping in the supine position has been linked to an increased occurrence of sleep paralysis.

See also
 Lying (position)
 Human positions
 Sex positions

References

Sleep